Carl Lauritzen (4 April 1879 – 18 April 1940), was a Danish actor. He appeared in 15 films between 1912 and 1920.

External links

1879 births
1940 deaths
Danish male film actors
Danish male silent film actors
20th-century Danish male actors
Male actors from Copenhagen